The Tennessee College of Applied Technology at Crump is one of 46 institutions in the Tennessee Board of Regents System, the seventh largest system of higher education in the nation. This system comprises six universities, thirteen community colleges, and 27 Colleges of Applied Technology. More than 80 percent of all Tennessee students attending public institutions are enrolled in a Tennessee Board of Regents institution.

Office the Tennessee Colleges of Applied Technology
The governing body of the Tennessee Colleges of Applied Technology is located in Nashville, Tennessee and James King serves as the Vice Chancellor for the Colleges of Applied Technology.

Accreditation
The Tennessee College of Applied Technology - Crump is accredited by the Council of Occupational Education (COE). The Council on Occupational Education (COE), is a regional accrediting agency of the Southern Association of Colleges and Schools.

Academic programs

Each of the Tennessee Colleges of Applied Technology offers programs based on geographic needs of businesses and industry. Therefore, each college has different academic programs and offerings based on their  in their service area. The Tennessee College of Applied Technology - Crump offers Certificates and Diplomas in the following programs:
Administrative Office Technology
Collision Repair Technology
Computer Information Systems (CIS)
Computer Information Technician (CIT)
Computerized Graphics Design
Drafting & CAD Technology
Electronics Technology
Health Information Technology
Heating, Ventilation, Air Conditioning, & Refrigeration
Industrial Electricity
Industrial Maintenance
Machine Tool Technology
Practical Nursing
Technology Foundations
Welding Technology

See also
 List of colleges and universities in Tennessee

References

External links

 Tennessee College of Applied Technology - Crump
 TBR Tennessee Colleges of Applied Technology Profile
 Tennessee Board of Regents
 Regents Online Degree Program
 Online Programs for TCATS

Education in Tennessee
Education in Hardin County, Tennessee
Buildings and structures in Hardin County, Tennessee
Public universities and colleges in Tennessee